Újezd is a municipality and village in Olomouc District in the Olomouc Region of the Czech Republic. It has about 1,400 inhabitants.

Administrative parts
Villages of Haukovice and Rybníček are administrative parts of Újezd.

References

Villages in Olomouc District